Tautua is a word in Samoan that expresses the cultural tradition of service to the family or aiga and specifically to the ali'i or titles of the family; it can also mean any service of an individual to a greater cause. Tautua is reflected in the Samoan proverb—o le ala i le pule o le tautua—the road to leadership is through service. Tautua can mean monetary and material contributions to fa'alavelave, which mean important extended family events such as weddings or funerals, but more often it means labor, such as cleaning and preparing family functions, cooking, taking care of the elderly and children of the extended family, farming in family plantations, etc.

References

Further reading

 Malama Meleisea (1987). The Making of Modern Samoa: Traditional Authority and Colonial Administration in the History of Western Samoa. University of the South Pacific Press.
 Vaai, Saleimoa (1999). Samoa Fa'amatai and the Rule of Law. Samoa : National University of Samoa. 

Samoan words and phrases